UE Lleida have played more than 70 seasons in Spanish football.

Key

Key to league record:
P = Played
W = Games won
D = Games drawn
L = Games lost
F = Goals for
A = Goals against
Pts = Points
Pos = Final position

Key to divisions:
Liga = La Liga
SegA = Segunda División
SegB = Segunda División B
Terc = Tercera División
Pref = Regional Preferente
1ReA = Primera Regional A
1ReB = Primera Regional B
2Reg = Segunda Regional
n/a = Not applicable

Key to rounds:
DNE = Did not enter
Disq = Disqualified
QR = Qualifying round
Grp = Group stage
R1 = Round 1
R2 = Round 2
R3 = Round 3
R4 = Round 4
R5 = Round 5

QF = Quarter-finals
SF = Semi-finals
AQF = Area quarter-finals
ASF = Area semi-finals
AF = Area final
RU = Runners-up
WS = Shared
W = Winners

Players in bold indicate the top scorer in the division that season.

Seasons

Promotion Leagues

Footnotes

A. : The Copa de la Liga competition for Segunda División B teams was contested between 1982–83 and 1984–85 seasons.
B. : Lleida lost the promotion against Olot.
C. : Lleida won the promotion against Rapitenca.
D. : Lleida finished second at the promotion League.
E. : Lleida finished eighth at the promotion League.
F. : Lleida wasn't relegated because a change to other Tercera División group.
G. : Lleida finished fourth at the promotion League.
H. : Lleida finished second at the promotion League.
I. : Lleida finished fifth at the promotion League.
J. : Lleida won the promotion first stage against Sant Andreu (5-3) on the aggregate but lost the final stage against Real Unión (7-8) on the aggregate.
K. : Lleida lost the promotion first stage against Plus Ultra (2-3) on the aggregate.
L. : Lleida won the promotion first stage against Alavés (9-2) on the aggregate and the final stage against Calvo Sotelo (5-3) on the aggregate.
M. : Lleida was relegated because a Segunda División change to one group.

Seasons
 
Lleida
Seasons